Cheltenham High School is a public high school in the Wyncote neighborhood of Cheltenham Township, in the U.S. state of Pennsylvania, located  from the border of the City of Philadelphia and  from Center City. Serving grades 9 through 12, Cheltenham is the only high school in the School District of Cheltenham Township. It is fed by Cedarbrook Middle School, the only school in the school district for grades 7 and 8.

Cheltenham High School was established in 1884 and is one of the oldest public high schools in Pennsylvania. The first location was on Ashbourne Road, and at the time of its closing in 1953, it was considered the oldest public school site in continuous use. The next building was at High School Road and Montgomery Avenue in Elkins Park. The current Cheltenham High School located at 500 Rices Mill Road in Wyncote was built in 1959. It sits on a land area of approximately 47 acres, and is bound by Route 309, Route 152, Panther Road, Rices Mill Road, Carlton Avenue, and Old Mill Road.

In 2017–18 the student ethnicity was distributed as follows: 54% Black, 31% White, 8% Asian, and 5% Hispanic. The school has approximately 1400 students in grades 9 through 12, with a student-teacher ratio of about 12:1.

Cheltenham's athletic teams are known as the Cheltenham Panthers and are members of the PIAA District 1 in the American Conference of the Suburban One League. They have a long-standing tradition of holding a Thanksgiving Day football game against their cross-town rival, Abington Senior High School. The rivalry celebrated its 100th year in 2015.

Among the school's notable alumni are the former Prime Minister of Israel Benjamin Netanyahu, his older brother Yoni Netanyahu, their class of 1964 classmate baseball Hall of Famer Reggie Jackson, talk radio host Mark Levin, 15-time Grammy Award winner Michael Brecker, and rapper Lil Dicky.

Operations
In 2004 the school adopted a stricter dress code because the administration felt that clothing that was too loose could hide identity badges and make identifying occupants more difficult.

Extracurriculars
Cheltenham Township School District offers a wide variety of clubs, activities and an extensive sports program.

Athletics

CHS is a member of the Pennsylvania Interscholastic Athletic Association (PIAA) and in the Suburban One American Conference (SOL). It was one of the founding members of the SOL in 1922, and is one of 4 of the remaining original schools. Cheltenham Athletics promote sportsmanship above self, and therefore, consistently receive the SOL Sportsmanship Award. Cheltenham has teams in the following sports: Asterisk designates available to both boys and girls.

Fall sports
Cross country running*
Boys football
Soccer*
Girls tennis
Girls volleyball
Coed cheerleading
Coed field hockey
Coed unified cheer

Winter sports
 Basketball *
 Indoor Track*
 Swimming/Diving *
 Boys wrestling

Spring sports
 Boys baseball 
 Boys tennis
 Track & field*
 Boys volleyball 
 Coed unified track
 Lacrosse*

Girls Basketball Team
The Cheltenham Girls basketball team won the PIAA AAAA state championship in 2000, and again in 2007. They have won PIAA District 1 titles, and the Suburban One American Conference 23 times. Coach Bob Schaefer won his 700th game on February 5, 2010, and has coached the Panthers for 30 years. He has coached the WBCA All-American Forward, Laura Harper, who played in the WNBA and is the current head coach at Coppin State. Harper scored 2007 points during her Cheltenham Career. In 2007 (their 2nd championship year), the Panthers were honored by the Philadelphia Sports Hall of Fame with the "Pride of Philadelphia Award." The award is given to individuals or teams who have "represented the Philadelphia area with dignity, determination, and class through athletic achievement. " On Tuesday March 27, 2012, Schafer resigned from his 31-year post as the Lady Panthers head coach. He finished with a 757-163 record, 2 PIAA AAAA state titles, 2 state runner-up, 4 District I Championships, and the Suburban One League champions 24 out of the last 26 years. Schaefer, a West Hazleton native, was inducted into the Hazleton Area Sports Hall of Fame in September, 2012.

Girls Track and Field
The Cheltenham Girls Track and Field Team has won six state championships. They have won four indoor PTFCA indoor state championships (2014, 2015, 2016, 2017) and two outdoor PIAA State Championships (2015, 2016). They have also won seven PIAA District 1 championships (2013 - 2019)

Cheltenham–Abington rivalry

The Cheltenham–Abington rivalry, also known as "The Turkey Bowl", is a football game played between the Cheltenham Panthers and the Abington Galloping Ghosts. It has been played annually on Thanksgiving Day since 1915, unless one of the teams has conflicts with PIAA playoffs. The rivalry is the fifth-oldest public high school rivalry in Pennsylvania, and the seventh-oldest including private schools. The schools are less than 2 miles apart. Despite not being in the same conference, the rivalry is prevalent in other sports, mainly basketball. In some sports, the teams do not play each other at all. Abington leads the overall series 55–34-6. Below is a chart of the all-time games of the rivalry.

Media
Cheltenham High School publishes a school newspaper "The Cheltonian," the school yearbook "El Delator," and various interviews, polls, and student work aired on Comcast channel 42, which is the township channel.

Music and arts

Vocal music
Cheltenham has many choir classes, such as Vwa Ba, Voces Altas, Concert Choir, and Select Choir, which all perform together biannually at the Winter and Spring Choir Concert. Other activities include the Touring Ensemble, CHS's show choir, in which students prepare a set of song and dance numbers-often with a central theme-and perform monthly around the community as well as at competitions. Most recently, the Touring Ensemble traveled to New Orleans in March of 2019. Cheltenham also sponsors two A cappella groups, Sons of Pitch and Up the Octave.

Band and orchestra
Marching Band, Chamber Orchestra, etc.

Theatre
Cheltenham hosts an annual Music Theatre production, which occurs annually on the week preceding Spring Break.

Notable alumni
The Cheltenham High School Hall of Fame was established to "acknowledge the achievements of our alma mater's most remarkable graduates". The first class was in 1981, and have had inductions in 1984, 1987, 1993, 1996, 1999, and 2002. Hall of Fame inductees have a HoF next to their name.

Michael Baylson '57 Federal Judge for United States District Court for the Eastern District of Pennsylvania HoF
Brandon Bing, '07 Professional Football Player for the New York Giants
Michael Brecker, '67 Grammy Award-winning Jazz Artist HoF
Randy Brecker, '63 Grammy Award-winning Jazz Artist HoF
Michael S. Brown, MD, '58 1985 Nobel Prize in Medicine HoF
David Burd, '06 Rapper, known as Lil Dicky
Laurie Colwin, '62 Author and Columnist HoF
Rebecca Creskoff, '88 Actress
Tom Feeney, Member of Congress, R-FL
Stuart F. Feldman, '54 (1937–2010), co-founder of Vietnam Veterans of America.
Glenn A. Fine, Inspector General, United States Department of Justice HoF
Wilmot E. Fleming, '35 State Senator HoF
Jon D. Fox, '65 U.S. Congressman HoF
Patricia Greenspan, '62 Philosopher
Robert Greenstein '63 founder and President of the Center on Budget and Policy Priorities HoF
Laura Harper, '04 Professional Basketball Player
Trina Schart Hyman, '56 Artist & Illustrator HoF
Reggie Jackson, '64 Professional Baseball Player HoF
Maxine Kumin '42 Poet and Novelist HoF
Mark Levin, '75 Conservative Talk Radio Host & Attorney
Richard Levinson, '52 Emmy Award-Winning Writer & Producer HoF
Chad Levitt (b. 1975), '93 American NFL football player
Franz Lidz, '69 Journalist
William Link, '52 Emmy Award-Winning Writer & Producer HoF
Craig Littlepage, '69 College Administrator & Educator HoF
Jeff Lorber, '70 Musician HoF'
Mary Ellen Mark, '58 Photojournalist HoF
Chris Myarick, '14 Professional Football Player (Miami Dolphins, New York Giants)
Robert J. Myers, '29 Co-creator of United States Social Security program HoF
Benjamin "Bibi" Netanyahu, '67 Prime Minister of Israel HoF
Yonatan "Yoni" Netanyahu (1946–1976), '64 Israeli military hero HoF
Ronald Perelman, '60 billionaire, philanthropist  
David Saxon, '37 Physicist, Educator & Administrator HoF
Norma Shapiro '45 U.S. District Court Judge HoF
Ronald M. Shapiro, '60 Notable Sports Agent, Corporate Attorney, New York Times Best Selling Author HoF
Robert C. Solomon, '60 Philosopher HoF
Jeffrey Sonnenfeld Senior Associate Dean for Executive Programs and Lester Crown Professor in the Practice of Management at Yale
Dan Trachtenberg, '99 Filmmaker
Wallace Triplett, '45 Professional Football Player HoF
Kate Vrijmoet, '84 Artist
Chris Williams, '02 Professional Soccer Player for Miami FC

Notable faculty
Paul Westhead Former Cheltenham Boys Basketball Coach, Oregon Ducks women's basketball coach; also coached the Los Angeles Lakers, Chicago Bulls, Denver Nuggets, and La Salle Explorers, among others.

References

External links
Cheltenham High School website
Cheltenham High School Profile

Public high schools in Pennsylvania
Educational institutions established in 1884
Schools in Montgomery County, Pennsylvania
1884 establishments in Pennsylvania
Cheltenham Township, Pennsylvania